The derde (derda, derdai, dardai) of Toubou residence at Zouar Tibesti is the title held by the highest religious and political authority for all Toubou Fron south Libya, north Chad, and northeast of Niger. 
He is elected among the three most prominent families of the Tomagra or Tomaghra clan, and at the death of the derde the title never passes to the son of the deceased, but to a member of the other two families.

The derde before 1930 Derde chef of State, Tubuland, sind 1930 lose power now only exercises judicial rather than executive power, arbitrating conflict and levying sanctions based on a code of compensations. He is assisted in the exercise of his role by a council of nobles.

It appears that already in the 17th century the derde of the Tomagra founder kanem borno empire. had already established its preeminence over much of the Tibesti, through the lines of succession still valid today. The Teda of the Tibesti in the 17th and 18th centuries distinguished themselves for their raids from the Fezzan to the north and to Borno to the south.

When the French colonial forces in 1907 made the first raids in northern Chad, the derde asked for the help of the Ottomans, who responded by establishing a few garrisons in Tibesti; but they were evacuated when the Ottomans were forced to cede Libya to Italy. The first French troops arrived later in 1914, but a moderate degree of control was exercised only from the 1930s. The derde collaborated with the French, retaining or even increasing this way their political and religious authority.

Chad became independent in 1960, and in 1965 the Chadian administration settled itself in Tibesti. The derde, Oueddei Kichidemi, saw himself stripped of his powers by the new government, provoking him in going in exile in 1966, an event considered the signal of the start of the Chadian Civil War in the north. The derde became now for the first time a national symbol through his opposition to the government, a role that after 1975, when the derde returned in Chad, was never to be recovered again.

References
  https://www.amazon.com/Teda-Tubu-Tebou-Toubou-Civilisation/dp/0692103996 

 J. Brachet & J. Scheele (2015). "Fleeting Glory in a Wasteland: Wealth, Politics, and Autonomy in Northern Chad". Comparative Studies in Society and History, 57(3), 723-752. doi:10.1017/S0010417515000262
A. Zaborski, "Tubu" in Encyclopaedia of Islam

Positions of authority
Titles
Society of Chad
Toubou people